X System or System X may refer to:

System X
 IBM System x, server platform
 System X (album)
 System X (supercomputer), supercomputer
 System X (telephony), digital switching platform

X System
 X-sistemo in Esperanto orthography
 SIGSALY, secure voice transmission system; sometimes called "X System"
 X Window System

See also

 System 10 (disambiguation)
 OSX (disambiguation)
 OS 10